The 2008 FIBA U16 European Championship Division C was held in Gibraltar, from 26 June to 1 July 2008. Eight teams participated in the competition.

Participating teams

 (hosts)

Group phase

Group A

Group B

Knockout stage

Bracket

5–8th place bracket

5th – 8th place classification

Semifinals

7th place game

5th place game

3rd place game

Final

Final standings

C
2007–08 in European basketball
Euro
International basketball competitions hosted by Gibraltar
FIBA U16 European Championship Division C